Gordon Froud (born 1963 in Johannesburg) is a South African artist and curator.  Froud's work has been showcased in hundreds of exhibitions throughout South Africa and the world, and he has served as a judge for several national art competitions. He has been the recipient of numerous awards including a Merit Award for Sculpture in the 1988 New Signatures Competition and an ABSA Gold Medal for contribution to the arts in 2005. Froud has also spent many years working as an art educator at both the secondary and tertiary level in London and South Africa. Perhaps known best for his use of found and untraditional materials in his sculptures, Froud attempts to explore the human condition in his work, particularly with regard to DNA, babies, genetics, bacteria, viruses and self-portraits. He currently balances his art practice and curation with running his own Gordart Gallery, which focuses on developing previously little-known artists.

Career

Education
Froud graduated from the University of Witwatersrand in 1987 with BA (FA) Honours and a Higher Education Diploma.  In 2007, he completed a Master of Technology degree at the University of Johannesburg.

Collections
 ABSA Bank Collection
 Pretoria Art Museum
 UNISA Art Gallery
 Sandton Civic Gallery
 Carfax Experience - Johannesburg
 South African Association of Arts
 Cite des Arts International – Paris
 South African Broadcasting Corporation - Johannesburg
 Alliance Francaise - Johannesburg
 Department of Science and Technology CSIR - Pretoria
 Mocambique Museum of Art – Maputo.
 Willow Ridge High School – Pretoria
 Steel Company – Cape Town
 SA High Commission - Maseru
 Li – Bel Restaurant – Pretoria
 La Pentola Restaurant – Pretoria
 Moses Mabilah Stadium – Durban
 North-West University – Potchefstroom

References

External links
Gordart Gallery
Fried Contemporary

Living people
1963 births
South African contemporary artists